Rabid is a 2019 Canadian body horror film directed and co-written by Jen and Sylvia Soska and starring Laura Vandervoort, Ben Hollingsworth, and Phil Brooks. It is a remake of the 1977 film of the same name directed by David Cronenberg.

Rabid premiered at the London FrightFest Film Festival on August 26, 2019.

Plot
After a young woman, Rose, suffers a disfiguring accident, she undergoes an experimental stem-cell treatment that leads to unintended consequences. She starts to have hallucinations and imagines killing people.

Cast
 Laura Vandervoort as Rose Miller
 Ben Hollingsworth as Brad, a fashion photographer
 Ted Atherton as Dr. William Burroughs
 Hanneke Talbot as Chelsea, Rose's best friend
 Mackenzie Gray as Gunter, a fashion designer
 Stephen McHattie as Dr. Michael Keloid
 Phil Brooks as Billy
 AJ Mendez as Kira
 Kevin Hanchard as Dr. Riley
 Greg Bryk as the Director
 Stephen Huszar as Dominic

Production
In February 2016, Jen and Sylvia Soska were hired to direct a remake of David Cronenberg's 1977 horror film Rabid, with producers Michael Walker, Paul LaLonde and John Vidette. The film had entered pre-production by February 2018, during which time the Soskas described the project as a continuation of the "thoughts and conversation" from the original and "modernized through a female perspective". In May 2018, Laura Vandervoort was cast as the film's protagonist, Rose.

Principal photography began in July 2018 in Toronto.

The film was produced by Back 40 Pictures in conjunction with Telefilm Canada and Ontario Media Development Corporation, and was financed by The Royal Bank of Canada, Media Finance Capital. Distribution rights were acquired by A71 Entertainment in Canada, Shout! Studios in the United States, 101 Films in the United Kingdom, and Madman Entertainment in Australia and New Zealand.

Release
Rabid premiered at the London FrightFest Film Festival on August 26, 2019. Rabid held its US premiere on October 15, 2019, at Screamfest Horror Film Festival in Los Angeles. The film was released theatrically, digitally, and on video on demand on December 13, 2019, by Shout! Studios. Release on DVD and Blu-Ray was on February 4, 2020.

Reception

References

External links
 

2019 films
2019 horror films
Remakes of Canadian films
Canadian body horror films
Canadian science fiction horror films
Canadian independent films
Canadian vampire films
Canadian zombie films
English-language Canadian films
Films shot in Toronto
Horror film remakes
Works about plastic surgery
2010s English-language films
2010s Canadian films